Chit Thaw Maung Maung is a 1963 Burmese black-and-white drama film, directed by Htun Htun starring Win Oo, Aung Lwin, Thi Thi and Than Nwet.

Cast
Win Oo
Aung Lwin
Thi Thi
Than Nwet

References

1963 films
1960s Burmese-language films
Burmese drama films
Films shot in Myanmar
1963 drama films